Nyaungdon is a town in the Ayeyarwady Region of south-west Myanmar. It is the seat of the Nyaungdon Township in the Maubin District.

Nyaungdon is the hometown of several prominent Burmese writers, poets, and artists. They include writers Lin Yun Thit Lwin, Yaung Ni, Tekkatho Han Win Aung, Tekkatho Nyi Lwin Maung, Tekkatho Nyo Nyo Thein, and July Moe, poets Pho Thaukkya, musicians Sandaya U Aung Ko, Zeya Pwint, Saw Tun Naing, Htay Win, Min Htet Tha, directors Dimishwedonbi Aung, Shwedon Htun Lwin, actors Tun Tun Naing, May Thinza U, Nyi Nyi Tun Lwin, San San Aye, Wai Lu Kyaw, and painter Win Myint Moe.

References

Populated places in Ayeyarwady Region
Township capitals of Myanmar